Swiftair Bahrain was a cargo airline based in Manama, Bahrain.

Fleet
The Swiftair Bahrain fleet included the following aircraft:

References

External links

Defunct airlines of Bahrain
Airlines established in 2008
Airlines disestablished in 2012
Defunct cargo airlines
2012 disestablishments in Bahrain
Companies based in Manama
Bahraini companies established in 2008